Relationship Dilemma is a 2015 Chinese romance film directed by Yang Xiaoxin. It was released on May 8, 2015 in China.

Cast
Ying Yuan
Yu Jia
Huang Junjun
Zhang Tianye
Jin Luoyi
Liu Qiushi
Dong Cheng

Reception
By May 12, 2015, the film had earned  at the Chinese box office.

References

2015 romantic drama films
Chinese romantic drama films
2010s Mandarin-language films